Åneby is a village in the municipality of Nittedal, Norway. Its population (2006) is 1356 .

Villages in Akershus